Sol Stern (born 1935) is the author of the book Breaking Free: Public School Lessons and the Imperative of School Choice (2003) and has written extensively on education reform.

Early life
Stern was born in Ramat Gan, Israel (then Mandatory Palestine) in 1935. He was raised in the Bronx from infancy and attended the City College of New York; the University of Iowa; and the University of California, Berkeley.

Radicalism
Stern began his career with the radical magazine Ramparts to which, in 1967, he contributed the article " A Short Account of International Student Politics and the Cold War with Particular Reference to the NSA, CIA, etc." It included the allegation that the Central Intelligence Agency (CIA) had supported the National Student Association, ties that later were confirmed by the organization itself. The CIA funded overseas projects to the tune of $3.3 million, and it recruited NSA staff members for intelligence work. In 1968, Stern signed the "Writers and Editors War Tax Protest" pledge, vowing to refuse tax payments to protest the Vietnam War.

Conservative shift
His departure from radicalism came after New Left attacks on Israel. He also collaborated with Ronald Radosh on a research project into the evidence against Julius and Ethel Rosenberg. Originally intending to prove their innocence, Stern and Radosh came to believe that the Rosenbergs had been guilty of spying for the Soviet Union. In 2008, The New York Times described him as a "cantankerous provocateur against liberal education policies, criticizing reading curriculums that de-emphasize phonics as well as public schools that focus on social justice." Stern has written critiques of Paulo Freire's work  and Bill Ayers's career as an education reformer for City Journal and elsewhere.

See also
Church Committee

References

External links
Sol Stern profile at the Manhattan Institute
Sol Stern interview at the New York Times, published February 13, 2008

1935 births
Living people
American male journalists
American tax resisters
Israeli emigrants to the United States
Jewish American writers
People from Ramat Gan
People from the Bronx
Journalists from New York City
Activists from New York (state)
Manhattan Institute for Policy Research
21st-century American Jews